Mont Grand-Fonds is a ski resort in the Charlevoix region of Quebec, Canada. It is situated in a rural part of the municipality of La Malbaie, north of its urban area. It has 14 alpine trails without false flats, with 3 glades and 1 teaching trail, 3 training trails and a snow park. It also has 140 kilometers of standard cross-country skiing trails and 46 km of skate-step cross-country trails.

It has a top elevation of 735 meters, a base elevation of 400 meters with a vertical of 335 meters.

Climate 
Mont Grand-Fonds has a warm-summer humid continental climate (Köppen: Dfb), although it approaches a continental subarctic climate (Dfc), categorized in the highest mountains to the northwest. The high amount of snow attracts people by performing winter activities such as skiing.

Notes

References

External links
 Mont Grand-Fonds official website

La Malbaie
Geography of Capitale-Nationale
Tourist attractions in Capitale-Nationale